Center Point is a city in Linn County, Iowa, United States. The population was 2,579 at the 2020 census. It is part of the Cedar Rapids Metropolitan Statistical Area.

History
The first house was built in Center Point in 1854.

Geography
Center Point is located at  (42.190618, -91.782500).

Demographics

2010 census
As of the census of 2010, there were 2,421 people, 887 households, and 665 families living in the city. The racial makeup of the city was 97.1% White, 0.9% African American, 0.4% Native American, 0.3% Asian, 0.3% from other races, and 1.0% from two or more races. Hispanic or Latino of any race were 0.4% of the population.

There were 887 households, of which 45.0% had children under the age of 18 living with them, 60.9% were married couples living together, 8.9% had a female householder with no husband present, 5.2% had a male householder with no wife present, and 25.0% were non-families. 20.4% of all households were made up of individuals, and 8.3% had someone living alone who was 65 years of age or older. The average household size was 2.73 and the average family size was 3.15.

The median age in the city was 34.7 years. 31.8% of residents were under the age of 18; 5.7% were between the ages of 18 and 24; 30.6% were from 25 to 44; 22.8% were from 45 to 64; and 9.1% were 65 years of age or older. The gender makeup of the city was 49.9% male and 50.1% female.

2000 census
As of the census of 2000, there were 2,007 people, 765 households, and 550 families living in the city. The racial makeup of the city was 98.36% White, 0.45% African American, 0.05% Native American, 0.10% Asian, 0.15% from other races, and 0.90% from two or more races. Hispanic or Latino of any race were 0.35% of the population.

There were 765 households, out of which 41.2% had children under the age of 18 living with them, 59.5% were married couples living together, 9.0% had a female householder with no husband present, and 28.1% were non-families. 23.7% of all households were made up of individuals, and 12.7% had someone living alone who was 65 years of age or older. The average household size was 2.62 and the average family size was 3.11.

Age spread: 30.4% under the age of 18, 6.5% from 18 to 24, 33.7% from 25 to 44, 18.4% from 45 to 64, and 10.9% who were 65 years of age or older. The median age was 34 years. For every 100 females, there were 95.4 males. For every 100 females age 18 and over, there were 93.1 males.

The median income for a household in the city was $48,352, and the median income for a family was $55,677. Males had a median income of $36,702 versus $25,601 for females. The per capita income for the city was $19,527. About 3.2% of families and 4.6% of the population were below the poverty line, including 5.4% of those under age 18 and 9.0% of those age 65 or over.

Education
It is within the Center Point–Urbana Community School District. The district formed on July 1, 1993, with the merger of the Center Point and Urbana districts.

References

External links
 Center Point City Website

Cities in Iowa
Cities in Linn County, Iowa
Cedar Rapids, Iowa metropolitan area
1854 establishments in Iowa
Populated places established in 1854